Kangra Lok Sabha constituency is one of the four Lok Sabha (parliamentary)  constituencies in Himachal Pradesh state in northern India.

Assembly segments
Kangra Lok Sabha constituency presently comprised the following 17 Vidhan Sabha (legislative assembly) segments:

Members of Parliament

Election results

2019

2014

2009

See also
 Kangra district
 List of Constituencies of the Lok Sabha

References

Lok Sabha constituencies in Himachal Pradesh
Kangra district
Chamba district